In geometry, the great truncated cuboctahedron (or quasitruncated cuboctahedron or stellatruncated cuboctahedron) is a nonconvex uniform polyhedron, indexed as U20. It has 26 faces (12 squares, 8 hexagons and 6 octagrams), 72 edges, and 48 vertices. It is represented by the Schläfli symbol tr{4/3,3}, and Coxeter-Dynkin diagram, . It is sometimes called the quasitruncated cuboctahedron because it is related to the truncated cuboctahedron, except that the octagonal faces are replaced by {8/3} octagrams.

Convex hull 

Its convex hull is a nonuniform truncated cuboctahedron. The truncated cuboctahedron and the great truncated cuboctahedron form isomorphic graphs despite their different geometric structure.

Orthographic projections

Cartesian coordinates 
Cartesian coordinates for the vertices of a great truncated cuboctahedron centered at the origin are all permutations of
 (±1, ±(1−), ±(1−2)).

See also 
 List of uniform polyhedra

References

External links 
 

Uniform polyhedra